Zacharie Robichon (born May 31, 1992) is a Canadian sportscar racer, who competes in the IMSA SportsCar Championship for Wright Motorsports.

Career

Karting
Robichon got his passion for car racing growing up came from his father who raced Formula cars in the 70s and 80s.

He began karting at 14 years of age and didn't enter a full season of competition until 2009 when he began racing in the Canadian National Karting Championships, Rotax Senior class.In September 2011, Robichon beat seven other karters to win the third "Hinchtown.com Canadian Karting Award" sponsored by IndyCar driver James Hinchcliffe. The prize was a fully-paid, three-day "Wheel to Wheel" race licensing course at the Bridgestone Racing Academy.

F1600
After competing for Canada in the annual Formula Ford Festival, Robichon moved to Formula 1600 after his father agreed to fund one season on the condition that he find sponsors to pay for subsequent years. In 2014 he competed in both the Toyo Tires Formula Tour 1600 and 2014 Toyo Tires F1600 Championship Class A Series with BGR Team Grote, as well as two races in the 2014 F2000 Championship Series. He took two podiums in four starts in the Formula Four and one win and three podiums in eight starts in the F1600 Championship Series.

In September, Robichon won the Can-Am Cup in a photo finish, catching leader Tristan DeGrand at the last turn on the final lap and then out-dragging his rival to the finish line.

In 2015, Robichon joined Brian Graham Racing and finished second overall in the Toyo Tires F1600 Championship "class A" Series, with three wins, eight podiums and five poles in eight starts. While racing in F1600, Robichon also worked as an engineer and mechanic for other drivers.

Porsche GT3 Cup
After three seasons of Formula 1600, Robichon made the switch to sportscars, racing in the Ultra 94 Porsche GT 3 Canada Series  for Mark Motors Racing in Ottawa in 2016.

He raced for three seasons in the Ultra 94 Porsche GT3 Cup Canada finishing third overall in 2016, with two wins and 10 podiums in 12 starts. He also started two races in the 2016 Porsche GT3 Cup Challenge USA scoring one podium for Mark Motors Racing.

He returned to Ultra 94 Porsche GT3 Cup Canada with Mark Motors in 2017, taking second overall with 2 two wins, 11 podiums and one pole in 12 races.

Robichon dominated the 2018 Ultra 94 GT3 Cup Challenge Canada by Yokohama on his way to the title, taking 11 wins, 12 podiums and nine poles in 12 starts. In August, Robichon got an emergency call while participating in a ride along event at Canadian Tire Motorsport Park from the Moorespeed team which needed a replacement driver for the Porsche GT3 Challenge USA race at Road America. Robichon swept both races that weekend

In all, he started eight Porsche GT3 Challenge USA races for Moorespeed in 2018, finishing taking home seven wins, seven podiums and eight poles. He finished 12th overall despite starting only half the races.

IMSA SportsCar Championship
In 2019, Robichon teamed with fellow Canadian Scott Hargrove at Pfaff Motorsports in the IMSA SportsCar Championship GTD class, driving a Porsche 911 GT3 R to third overall, with wins in the 2019 Northeast Grand Prix and the 2019 Road Race Showcase at Road America.

Although the plan for 2020 was to challenge for the GTD title, it got derailed due to COVID-19 pandemic. Robichon's full-time teammates for the season were Lars Kern and Dennis Olsen. In addition, Patrick Pilet joining the squad for the 24 Hours of Daytona.

Pfaff Motorsoport's Toronto base combined with border restraictions made comnpeteling in a full season impossible. In the end, Robichon only started two races in GTD, the pre-COVID 2020 24 Hours of Daytona where Pfaff started on pole but finished 13th. In its other start in 2020, the team finished 5th in the 2020 IMSA SportsCar Weekend at Road America.

With Pfaff Motorsport Porsche's plaid livery quickly becoming a fan favorite, the team arrived at the 2020 season opening Rolex 24 at Daytona with custom race suits that made the driver look like lumberjacks wearing plaid shirts and blue jeans.

In 2021, Robichon welcomed new teammate Laurens Vanthoor at Pfaff Motorsports. The pair struggled in the first half of the 10-race season, managing only one win in the first five starts, although the victory came in the prestigious 12 Hours of Sebring.

After a second in Long Beach, the pair were victorious again at the Michelin GT Challenge at VIR, setting the stage for a title showdown at the season finale.

A second in the Petit Le Mans at Road Atlanta was enough to deliver the GTD team championship to Pfaff Motorsports and the drivers’ title to Robichon and Vanthoor. The podium in the season finale ended an impressive string of three victories and two second-place finishes in the second half. In all, the pair took four wins and six podiums in 10 starts to win the IMSA SportsCar Championship GTD class title.

With Pfaff Motorsport moving the GTD Pro in 2022, Robichon joined Wright Motorsports in its Porsche 911 GT3 R GTD class entry.

In 2022, Robichon Raced the four rounds of the Michelin Endurance Cup: 24 Hours of Daytona, 12 Hours of Sebring (Sebring), 6 hours at the Glen (Watkins Glen International), and Petit Le Mans (Michelin Raceway Road Atlanta). He admitted that moving into a part-time role brought concerns about fitting into the team and being a third wheel to the ouftfit's full-time drivers, Ryan Hardwick and Jan Heylen.

In his first race with his new team, he took a class victory at Daytona with teammates Ryan Hardwick, Jan Heylen, and Richard Lietz.

European Le Mans Series
On the heels of his victory in the 24 Hours of Daytona, Robichon joined with Proton Competition in the European Le Mans Series, racing Porsche 911 RSR-19 in the GTE class alongside the actor Michael Fassbender and Porsche factory driver Richard Lietz.

In his first start in the 24 Hours of Le Mans in June, Robichon finished a disappointing 16th in class and 51st overall.

Racing results

Complete IMSA SportsCar Championship results
(key) (Races in bold indicate pole position) (Races in italics indicate fastest lap)

* Season still in progress.

24 Hours of Le Mans results

Personal life
Robichon has degrees in business and finance.

Outside of racing, he owns an event management company that runs all the driving related activities for Porsche Canada. The company has a 30 staff that offers driving experiences for Porsche owners, track days, and winter safety courses.

References

External links 

1992 births
Living people
Canadian racing drivers
European Le Mans Series drivers
Racing drivers from Ontario
Sportspeople from Ottawa
WeatherTech SportsCar Championship drivers
24 Hours of Daytona drivers
24 Hours of Le Mans drivers
FIA World Endurance Championship drivers